The Kayan National Party is a political party in Myanmar.

Unlike Kayan New Land Party and other parties which failed to be approved by the Union Election Commission (UEC) in Kayah State, it was allowed to register to contest the election in 2011.

Kayan New Land Party
Kayan New Land Party (KNLP) was founded in 1986.
Organizations home in Special Region-3, Karenni State Kayan National Guard (KNG) is a breakaway group from KNLP in 1992.
KNLP have a cease-fire agreements with the Junta, from 26 July 1994 
Shwe Aye is the leader.
Kayan New Land Party (KNLP); Between 200 and 700 men in 2001.
In April 2009 have KNLP about 200 men and KNG about 150 men.
KNLP is a part of National Democratic Front (NDF).

References

Political parties in Myanmar